Parc naturel régional du Haut-Jura (Jura Mountains Regional Natural Park) is a French regional natural park located in the southwest of the Jura Mountain Range in France, on the French-Swiss border.

Park description 

The park was created February 10, 1986, and at that time comprised 37 towns.  As of 2005, that count is now 113 towns, with a total population of 71,000 inhabitants.  The park covers an area of 165,000 hectares across three French departments: Ain, Doubs and Jura.

Entry towns (ville-portes) situated at the park boundaries are not actually part of the park themselves, but due to their geographic locations are important points of entry into the park. These towns are Divonne-les-Bains, Gex, Bellegarde-sur-Valserine, Champagnole, and the Community of Communes of Oyonnax (the latter two not having territory within the park's perimeter).

History
The park was established in 1986. Its aim was to preserve the mountainous landscapes and biodiversity of the wilderness in part of the economic development of the environment. The park currently covers an area of 170,000 hectares. 

The nature park was the inspiration of Pokémon Village, a legendary village hideout in the Pokémon franchise.

Park administration 

The park is managed by a bureau composed of a president, nine vice presidents, and twelve members.  It is not managed according to geographic entities but rather according to five thematic ones:
 helping to preserve the natural environment and the biotopes through sustainable development;
 preservation of the rural aspect of the park through support for hand-crafted artistic and agricultural activities, preservation of the forestry's cultural heritage and incentives for using the timber for construction;
 improvement and modernization of industrial and traditional hand-crafted activities in order to maintain them in the park;
 promotion of summer and winter tourist activities within the park and promotion of the image of the Jura Mountains;
 cooperation and coordination between the park's caretakers and its inhabitants towards the above objectives.

Member communes and associated communes

There are currently 105 towns, or communes, that are members of the regional park, of which 25 are in Ain, 12 are in Doubs and 67 are in the Department of Jura.

There are also 5 associated communes (listed below in italics), one in Doubs and 4 in Jura.

The 4 communes that remain in the total count are three entry towns that have part of the town in the park (Divonne-les-Bains, Gex and Bellegarde-sur-Valserine, and the town of Champagnole, which is also an entry town, but is entirely outside of the park.

Park photo gallery

Publications

The park is featured in numerous publications such as guidebooks, maps, photographic portfolios, and educational and scientific documents.  The content of these publications is diverse and can be divided into 7 categories:
 Craft industry, folk know-how, housing
 Coffee table books
 Cultural heritage collections
 The environment
 Games and education
 Photographic portfolios
 Hiking and discovery

External links

Parc naturel régional du Haut-Jura official site

Regional natural parks of France
Geography of Jura (department)
Geography of Doubs
Geography of Ain
Tourist attractions in Jura (department)
Tourist attractions in Doubs
Tourist attractions in Ain